The Battle of Nanpeng Island was a battle fought between the Chinese Nationalists and the Chinese Communists. After Guangdong fell into communist hands, a detachment of the Nationalist troops held out on Nanpeng Island of Yangjiang. This remnant of the Nationalist forces proved to be a major headache the Communists because the island is strategically located between the Pearl River mouth and the Qiongzhou Strait, controlling the shipping line that was vital to the local economy.

The Communists decided to rid of the Nationalist forces and take the island.  In the morning of August 9, 1950, the third battalion of the 364th regiment of the 41st Army of the People's Liberation Army attacked the island. After two hours of fighting, the entire Nationalist garrison of Nanpeng Island of 421 was lost and the island was firmly in the Communist hands. The Communists succeeded in capturing one motorized vessel, twenty junks, one artillery piece, ten machine guns, and another 194 firearms.

The Nationalists did not have any chance against the overwhelming enemy because the island is located too far away from any friendly bases. In the event of breaking out of the battle, no Nationalist reinforcement could reach the island in time. The local commanders had repeatedly asked the permission to withdraw to Taiwan but their pleas were ignored due to political reasons because holding out at the enemy's doorstep far away from any friendly bases had very significant symbolic meaning, but in doing so, the fate of the local defenders was sealed.

See also
List of Battles of Chinese Civil War
National Revolutionary Army
History of the People's Liberation Army
Chinese Civil War

References
Zhu, Zongzhen and Wang, Chaoguang, Liberation War History, 1st Edition, Social Scientific Literary Publishing House in Beijing, 2000,  (set)
Zhang, Ping, History of the Liberation War, 1st Edition, Chinese Youth Publishing House in Beijing, 1987,  (pbk.)
Jie, Lifu, Records of the Liberation War: The Decisive Battle of Two Kinds of Fates, 1st Edition, Hebei People's Publishing House in Shijiazhuang, 1990,  (set)
Literary and Historical Research Committee of the Anhui Committee of the Chinese People's Political Consultative Conference, Liberation War, 1st Edition, Anhui People's Publishing House in Hefei, 1987, 
Li, Zuomin, Heroic Division and Iron Horse: Records of the Liberation War, 1st Edition, Chinese Communist Party History Publishing House in Beijing, 2004, 
Wang, Xingsheng, and Zhang, Jingshan, Chinese Liberation War, 1st Edition, People's Liberation Army Literature and Art Publishing House in Beijing, 2001,  (set)
Huang, Youlan, History of the Chinese People's Liberation War, 1st Edition, Archives Publishing House in Beijing, 1992, 
Liu Wusheng, From Yan'an to Beijing: A Collection of Military Records and Research Publications of Important Campaigns in the Liberation War, 1st Edition, Central Literary Publishing House in Beijing, 1993, 
Tang, Yilu and Bi, Jianzhong, History of Chinese People's Liberation Army in Chinese Liberation War, 1st Edition, Military Scientific Publishing House in Beijing, 1993 – 1997,  (Volum 1), 7800219615 (Volum 2), 7800219631 (Volum 3), 7801370937 (Volum 4), and 7801370953 (Volum 5)

Conflicts in 1950
Nanpeng Island
1950 in China
Military history of Guangdong